Ronald Sinclair Faulds (2 August 1922 – 8 March 2006), known as Ron Faulds, was an Australian diver. He competed at the 1952 Summer Olympics and the 1956 Summer Olympics.

References

External links
 
 

1922 births
2006 deaths
Australian male divers
Olympic divers of Australia
Divers at the 1952 Summer Olympics
Divers at the 1956 Summer Olympics
Divers from Melbourne
20th-century Australian people
21st-century Australian people
People from Moonee Ponds, Victoria